MYcroSchool is a series of Florida-based tuition-free public charter high schools owned and operated by NEWCorp, Inc. MYcroSchool is a nonprofit 501(c)3 organization that offers a standard high school diploma. MYcroSchool campuses are accredited by Cognia (SACS CASI).

Since 2001, New Education for the Workplace (NEWCorp), a 501(c)3 nonprofit corporation, has promoted education and provided educational management services for academic programs that serve highly at-promise students.

NEWCorp focuses on providing educational opportunities through charter schools and vocational training for students who may have not been successful in traditional schools. The mission of NEWCorp is to advance the career technical education and training of young men and women and to manage, operate, guide, direct, and promote charter schools.

Overall, NEWCorp strives to transform struggling students into lifelong learners who benefit their communities.

NEWCorp serves five MYcroSchool programs.  Three in Jacksonville, one in Gainesville, and one in St. Petersburg.

References 

 https://www.mycroschool.com/schools
 https://www.newcorpschools.org
 https://www.mycroschool.org

Schools in Florida